Newcastle Olympic Football Club is a semi-professional association football club based in Hamilton a suburb of Newcastle, New South Wales. They currently compete in the National Premier Leagues Northern NSW, the second tier of football in Australia. They were known as Hamilton Olympic between 1992 and 2019.

History
The club was established by Greek immigrants in the New South Wales city of Newcastle in 1976. They are one of the most successful football clubs in Newcastle.

Honours
 Northern NSW Premier League Club Champions: 1998, 2000, 2001, 2007, 2012, 2016, 2017, 2018
 NBN State League Champions: 1998, 1999, 2000, 2001, 2007, 2009
 NBN State League Minor Premiers: 2012
 Midweek Cup: 1998
 President's Cup: 2001, 2004
 Charity Shield: 2009
 NBN State League Reserve Grade Champions: 1994, 1998, 2003, 2004, 2012
 NBN State League Reserve Grade Minor Premiers: 1997, 1998, 2000, 2003, 2004
 NBN State League Youth Champions: 2002, 2005, 2006, 2009
 NBN State League Youth Minor Premiers: 1994, 1998, 2006, 2008, 2009
 Division 2 Champions: 1991
 Division 2 Minor Premiers: 1991
 Division 3 Champions: 1990
 Division 3 Minor Premiers: 1990, 1979
 Division 4 Champions: 1978
 Division 4 Minor Premiers: 1989, 1978

Secondary Club Teams
 Inter-District Division 3 Minor Premiers: 2011

Current squad

References

External links
Official website

National Premier Leagues clubs
Soccer clubs in New South Wales
Association football clubs established in 1976
1976 establishments in Australia
Sports teams in Newcastle, New South Wales
Diaspora sports clubs in Australia